Residential school  may refer to:
 American Indian boarding schools
 Canadian Indian residential school system
 List of Indian residential schools in Canada
 Boarding school
 Residential treatment center for people with addictions or severe mental illnesses
 Therapeutic boarding school